Rinpung Dzong, sometimes referred to as Paro Dzong, is a large dzong - Buddhist monastery and fortress - of the Drukpa Lineage of the Kagyu school in Paro District, Bhutan. It houses the district Monastic Body as well as government administrative offices of Paro Dzongkhag. It is listed as a tentative site in Bhutan's Tentative List for UNESCO inclusion.

History
In the 15th century local people offered the crag of Hungrel at Paro to Lama Drung Drung Gyal, a descendant of Pajo Drugom Zhigpo. Drung Drung Gyal built a small temple there and later a five storied Dzong or fortress which was known as Hungrel Dzong.

In the 17th century, his descendants, the lords of Hungrel, offered this fortress to the Drukpa hierarch, Ngawang Namgyal, the Zhabdrung Rinpoche, in recognition of his religious and temporal authority. In 1644 the Zhabdrung dismantled the existing dzong and laid the foundations of a new dzong. In 1646 the dzong was reconsecrated and established as the administrative and monastic centre of the western region and it became known as "Rinpung Dzong".

Some scenes in the 1993 film Little Buddha were filmed in this dzong.

Shrines and chapels

Inside Rinpung Dzong are fourteen shrines and chapels:
Kungarwa
Monks' assembly hall
Sandalwood Stupa
Protector's shrine
Temple of the Guru's Eight Manifistations
Chapel of the head lama
Chapel of Amitayus
The Clear Crystal Shrine
Chapel of the Eleven-faced Avalokiteśvara
Apartments of the Abbot
Chapel of Akshobhya
Temple of the Treasure Revealer
Apartments of the King (Gyalpo'i Zimchung)
Temple of the Bursar

Outside the main dzong is the Deyangkha Temple.

On the hill above Rinpung Dzong is a seven-storied the watchtower fortress or Ta Dzong built in 1649. In 1968 this was established as the home of the National Museum of Bhutan.

Just below Rinpung Dzong is a traditional covered cantilever bridge.

Festivals

A great annual festival or tshechu is held at Rinpung Dzong from the eleventh to the fifteenth day of the second month of the traditional Bhutanese lunar calendar (usually in  March or April of the Gregorian calendar). On this occasion, holy images are taken in a procession. This is followed by a series of traditional mask dances conveying religious stories which are performed by monks for several days.

Before the break of dawn on the morning of the fifteenth day, a great sacred thongdrel banner thangka depicting the Eight Manifestations of Padmasambhava is displayed for the public in the early morning hours, to keep to the tradition of not allowing sunlight to fall on it.

References

Sources

External links
 Paro Rinpung Dzong
About Rinpung Dzong
More on Rinpung Dzong
 

Dzongs in Bhutan
Buddhist monasteries in Bhutan
Tibetan Buddhism in Bhutan